The Abbot of Glenluce (later, Commendator of Glenluce) was the head of the monastic community of Glenluce Abbey, Galloway. The monastery was founded in 1192 by monks from Dundrennan Abbey with the patronage of Lochlann (Roland), Lord of Galloway. In the 16th century the monastery increasingly came under the control of secular warlords. In 1560 the monastery was occupied by James Gordon of Lochinvar (brother of the recently deceased commendator), and the monks were expelled. However, soon after, Thomas Hay, a follower of the earl of Cassillis (Lochinvar's enemy), was installed in the monastery as commendator and the monks were allowed to return. However, monastic life seems to have disappeared by the end of the century. In 1602 parliament granted the lands of the monastery to Lawrence Gordon as a secular lordship. The abbey was finally given to the bishop of Galloway in 1619. The following is a list of abbots and abbot-commendators:

List of abbots
 William, fl. 1214-1216
 John, fl. 1222
 Gilbert, 1222 x 1233-1233
 Robert, fl. 1236
 Michael I, 1236-1243
 Alan Musarde, fl. 1244
 Godfrey, fl. 1273
 Alexander de Northberwic, fl. 1329
 Bede, fl. 1347
 Adam, fl. 1381
 John White, fl. x 1486
 Andrew Ramsay, fl. 1486
 Michael II, fl. 1493-1499

List of commendators
 Robert Beaton, 1500-1509
 Richard Rinayd, 1507
 Dominic Grimani, 1509-1520
 Quintin MacCalbert, 1509 x 1512
 [Gille?] Cuthbert Baillie, 1512-1513
 Gilbert Strachan, 1512
 Peter de Accoltis, 1513
 David Hamilton, 1513-1519
 Alexander Cunningham, 1513-1518 x 1519
 Walter Malim, 1519-1556
 James Gordon, 1547-1559
 Thomas Hay, 1560-1575
 Gilbert Moncrieff, 1581-1582
 Laurence Gordon, 1582-1602
 William Gordon, 1582

Notes

Bibliography
 Cowan, Ian B. & Easson, David E., Medieval Religious Houses: Scotland With an Appendix on the Houses in the Isle of Man, Second Edition, (London, 1976), p. 75
 Watt, D.E.R. & Shead, N.F. (eds.), The Heads of Religious Houses in Scotland from the 12th to the 16th Centuries, The Scottish Records Society, New Series, Volume 24, (Edinburgh, 2001), pp. 86–90

Cistercian abbots by monastery
Scottish abbots
Lists of abbots